is a Buddhist temple of the Ōbaku school of Buddhism in Gifu, Gifu Prefecture, Japan. It is a branch temple of Mampuku-ji in Uji, Kyoto Prefecture. The temple has many aspects of the Ōbaku school, but its building style and sacraments are in the Chinese style. Additionally, it is much larger than the average Japanese temple. The temple's official name is Kinpōzan Shōhō-ji (金鳳山正法寺).

History
The temple was first established in 1638, but did not join the Ōbaku school until 1692. In 1790, Ichū (推中), the 11th head priest, began planning the construction of the Gifu Great Buddha out of respect for Tōdai-ji's Great Buddha in Nara. Ichū never saw the completed Buddha, as he died in 1825. The Great Buddha was finally completed in 1832.

Facility information
Hours of Operation
April to October: 9:00am to 6:00pm
November to March: 9:00am to 5:00pm
Open throughout the year.
Entrance Fee
{| class="wikitable"
|-
! 
! Individual Rate
|-
| Adult
| 200yen
|-
| Child
| 100yen
|}

Access
From JR Gifu Station (Bus Platform 11) or Meitetsu Gifu Station (Bus Platform 4), board any bus towards Nagara. Get off the bus at "Gifu Koen, Rekishi Hakubutsukan-mae," approximately 15 minutes from the train stations.

See also 
 For an explanation of terms concerning Japanese Buddhism, Japanese Buddhist art, and Japanese Buddhist temple architecture, see the Glossary of Japanese Buddhism.

References and external links

Images 

Buildings and structures in Gifu
Buddhist temples in Gifu Prefecture
Obaku temples
1638 establishments in Japan